Bhoksa, also known as Buksa/Bukhasiya, are indigenous peoples living mainly in the Indian states of Uttarakhand and Uttar Pradesh. They are mostly concentrated in Dehradun and Nainital districts in the foothills of the outer Himalayas. They are also found in the Bijnor district of Uttar Pradesh, where they are known as Khas. Both communities have been granted Scheduled Tribe status.

History
The Bhoksa speak the Buksa language.

The language is spoken in Uttarakhand, mainly in southwestern Nainital district, along a diagonal from Ramnagar to Dineshpur. It is spoken around 130 villages in Kichha and Kashipur tehsils, some in Bijnor and Pauri Garhwal district.

Present circumstances 
, the Bhoksa of Uttarakhand were classified as a Scheduled Tribe under the Indian government's reservation program of affirmative action. As Buksa, they are similarly classified in Uttar Pradesh.

See also 
List of Scheduled Tribes in Uttar Pradesh

References

Scheduled Tribes of Uttar Pradesh
Scheduled Tribes of Uttarakhand
Bijnor district